Sanabares (Greek: ϹΑΝΑΒΑΡΟΥ Sanabarou; 135-160 CE)  was an Indo-Parthian king. He was the last Indo-Parthian king to rule in both Sakastan and south Arachosia, as the Kushans under Wima Kadphises made inroads into Indo-Parthian territory. The kingdom of Turan covers the period from 160 to 230 CE.

In his coinage, Sabares introduced a close-fitting Parthian-style tiara for his portraiture, a characteristic which was later continued by Pahares I. On the reverse has a figure of Nike walking.

A Sanabares II seems to have ruled in Sakastan from 160 to 230 CE.

References

Sources
 
  

Indo-Parthian kings
2nd-century monarchs in Asia
Year of death unknown
Year of birth unknown
2nd-century Iranian people
135 births